Danmarks Nationalbank issued a 200 kroner bank note on 10 March 1997 – updated on 9 April 2003 – out of print as of 19 October 2010.

The Danish 200 kroner bill (DKK200) is a denomination of Danish currency.  Danish actress Johanne Luise Heiberg is featured on the front side of the bill, while a lion from the apse of Viborg Cathedral is featured on the reverse side.  The current version of this bill came into circulation on 9 April 2003.

The face of the banknote has a portrait of Johanne Luise Heiberg (22 November 1812 to 21 December 1890). She was one of the greatest Danish actresses of the 19th century and took the Royal Theatre in Copenhagen by storm on countless occasions. Her autobiography Et liv genoplevet i erindringen (A Life Relived in Memory) is a major literary work from the Danish golden age.

The motif on the reverse of the 200 kroner banknote is a lion from the apse of Viborg Cathedral.

9 April 2003 the Danish national bank improved the security features with a hologram of a lion, the Roman numeral "CC," and the number "200." When the note is tilted the "CC" grows larger.

References 

 

Banknotes of Denmark
Portraits on banknotes